Catullus 36 is a Latin poem of twenty lines in Phalaecean metre by the Roman poet Catullus.

Text

Analysis 
Catullus calls upon the Annales Volusi to aid him in the discharge of a vow made by Lesbia, invokes Venus to recognize the payment, and with the word throws the Annals into the fire.

According to E. T. Merrill, the poem was evidently written about 59 or 58 BC, in the short period of reconciliation after the temporary coolness marked by Catullus 8.1ff.

References

Sources 
 Burton, Richard F.; Smithers, Leonard C., eds. (1894). The Carmina of Caius Valerius Catullus. London: Printed for the Translators: for Private Subscribers. pp. 66–68.
 Merrill, Elmer Truesdell, ed. (1893). Catullus (College Series of Latin Authors). Boston, MA: Ginn and Company. pp. 64–66. 
 Morgan, M. Gwyn (1980). "Catullus and the "Annales Volusi"". Quaderni Urbinati Di Cultura Classica, 4. pp. 59–67.

Further reading 

 Clarke, G. W. (1968). "The Burning of Books and Catullus 36". Latomus, 27. pp. 576–580.
 Comfort, H. (1929). "An Interpretation of Catullus XXXVI". Classical Philology, 24. pp. 176–182. .
 Morgan, M. G. (1980). "Catullus and the Annales Volusi". Quaderni Urbinati di Cultura Classica, 4. pp. 59–67.
 Østerud, S. (1978). "Sacrifice and Bookburning in Catullus' Poem 36". Hermes, 106. pp. 138–155.
 Solodow, J. P. (1989). "Forms of Literary Criticism in Catullus: Polymetric vs. Epigram". Classical Philology, 84. pp. 312–319.

External links 
 C. Valerius Catullus. "Catul. 36". Carmina. Leonard C. Smithers, ed. Perseus Digital Library. Retrieved 27 February 2023.

C036
Articles containing video clips
Love poems